Claudia Liliana González Aragón (born 1969) is a Colombian actress from Cali.

González studied Architecture but decided to become an actress after taking some acting courses while at college. She started to play small roles in television until 1994, when she played Daniela Reyes in the successful RCN TV telenovela Café con aroma de mujer. She suspended briefly her career after getting married, but returned in the 1998 Producciones Punch telenovela Amores como el nuestro.

As of 2009, she plays Captain Lina Vargas in the Caracol TV telenovela Bermúdez, and presents Deco Art in the cable channel Utilísima.

Selected filmography
Victorinos (2009, telenovela, Telemundo) as Lina María
El Clon (2010, telenovela, Telemundo Studios Miami) as Clara
Bermúdez (2009, telenovela, Caracol TV) as Lina Vargas
Pocholo (2007, telenovela, Caracol TV) as Pachita
Pecados capitales (2003, telenovela, Caracol TV) as Teresa
Luzbel está de visita (2002, telenovela, RTI Colombia)
Padres e hijos (2002, TV series, Colombiana de Televisión/Caracol TV)
Marido y mujer (1999, telenovela, Caracol TV) as Ana Martha
Amores como el nuestro (1998, telenovela, Producciones Punch/Canal Uno) as Martha de Restrepo
Solo una mujer (1995, telenovela, Caracol TV/Cadena Uno)
Cazados (1995, sitcom, Producciones Punch/Canal A)
Solo una mujer (1995, TV Serie) as Matilde
Lazos mortales (1994, TV Serie, Cali)
Café con aroma de mujer (1994, telenovela, RCN TV/Canal A) as Daniela Reyes
La casita del placer (teatro)
Solo una mujer

References

External links
Colarte
Utilísima - Deco Art

20th-century Colombian actresses
Colombian television actresses
Colombian telenovela actresses
1969 births
Living people
21st-century Colombian actresses
Actresses from Cali